JAV or Jav may refer to:
 Ilulissat Airport, in Greenland (IATA code JAV)
 Japanese Adult Video
 Javanese language (ISO 639-2 code "jav")
 Javier (name)
 Jebel Ali Village, a neighbourhood in Dubai, UAE
 Jordan Aviation, an airline based in Jordan
 , the German Youth and Trainees Council
 Sándor Jávorka (1883–1961), Hungarian botanist
 Yav or Jav, the material world in Eastern Slavic mythology